Contigo is the twenty-third studio album by La Mafia.  It was released on October 16, 2000. The album reached number five on the billboard charts. The album was nominated for the 2002 Grammy Awards for Best Mexican/Mexican-American album. This is the first album on Fonovisa Records label.

Track listing

Chart position

References

2000 albums
La Mafia albums
Spanish-language albums